Sophie Brack is a former camogie player who was selected on the camogie team of the century in 2004, and winner of All Ireland medals in 1948, 1949, 1950, 1951, 1952, 1953, 1954 and 1955.

Background and career
She won eight All Ireland medals with Dublin. When the CIE club represented Dublin because of an affiliation dispute in 1948, Sophie captained the team to win the O'Duffy Cup, scoring two goals in the first ten minutes and three goals overall in the final. She went on to captain Dublin winning teams on five other occasions, a record unlikely ever to be equalled. A prolific goalscorer, she also scored three goals in the 1950 "home" final, four goals in the 1951 final, and three goals in each of the 1954 and 1955 finals.

Citation
Her team of the century citation described her as "the pioneer of full forwards, opening up the play for others and moving into space with great intelligence. Playing at the edge of the square from she varied her tactics making life difficult for backs and goalkeepers alike. Possessing lightning speed and great positional sense she was a prolific scorer. A legend among her peers she gave great service to the game of Camogie as a player of exceptional ability and as an able administrator. Her untimely death in 1996 robbed the association of an exceptional contributor."

References

External links

Year of birth missing
Cork camogie players
1996 deaths